Julia Montoussé Fargues (died 27 September 1971 in Avilés) was a Spanish inventor of French origin, considered the inventor of the mop, alongside her daughter Julia Rodríguez-Maribona.

References 

1971 deaths
Spanish inventors